Eulimella gofasi is a species of sea snail, a marine gastropod mollusk in the family Pyramidellidae, the pyrams and their allies.

Description
The size of the shell varies between 2 mm and 3 mm. Each whorl contains four of five incisions.

Distribution
This species occurs in the Atlantic Ocean off West Africa (Mauritania, Guinea) at depths between 20 m and 152 m

References

External links
 To World Register of Marine Species

gofasi
Invertebrates of West Africa
Invertebrates of Guinea
Molluscs of the Atlantic Ocean
Gastropods described in 1994